The Royal Family Order of Haakon VII of Norway is an honour that was bestowed on members of the Norwegian royal family by King Haakon VII.

Princess Astrid, Mrs. Ferner is the only living recipient.

Appearance

The insignia of the Order consists of a portrait of the King set in a jeweled frame. The ribbon of the order is red, bordered white, with a blue fimbriation.

List of recipients

Queen Maud of Norway 
Crown Princess Märtha
Princess Astrid, Mrs. Ferner 
Princess Ragnhild, Mrs. Lorentzen

References

Bibliography
Tom Bergroth: «Royal Portrait Badges», i Guy Stair Sainty og Rafal Heydel-Mankoo: World Orders of Knighthood and Merit, første bind, Buckingham: Burke's Peerage, 2006, p. 829
Dag T. Hoelseth: «The Norwegian Royal House Orders», i Guy Stair Sainty og Rafal Heydel-Mankoo: World Orders of Knighthood and Merit, første bind, Buckingham: Burke's Peerage, 2006, p. 815
Lars Stevnsborg: Kongeriget Danmarks ordener, medaljer og hederstegn. Kongeriget Islands ordener og medaljer, Syddansk Universitetsforlag, 2005, p. 199–212

Orders, decorations, and medals of Norway
Awards established in 1906
1906 establishments in Norway
Norwegian monarchy